Chisi Island is a small island in the middle of Lake Chilwa. Lake Chilwa is the second largest lake in Malawi. The natives of the island have a wide knowledge of forest and lake usage. There are a few fortified sanctuaries built into the island's hills. Chisi Island is home to Mchenga, a large tree much wider than two humans standing side by side.  Chisi Island is sometimes referred to as the most remote location in Malawi.  

Lake islands of Malawi